The Symphony No. 63, Op. 411, Loon Lake is a symphony for orchestra in two movements by the American composer Alan Hovhaness.  The work was commissioned in September 1987 by the New Hampshire Music Festival and the Loon Preservation Society.  It was completed in early 1988 and premiered August 18, 1988, with conductor Thomas Nee leading the New Hampshire Music Festival Orchestra.  The ending of the piece was later revised by Hovhaness at the request of his wife; the revised symphony premiered July 2, 1991, and is the only version available on recording.

Composition

Structure
Loon Lake has a duration of roughly 26 minutes and is composed in two movements:
Prelude: Largo solenne, andante pastorale
Andante misterioso, maestoso, presto, allegro

Instrumentation
The symphony is scored for a small orchestra comprising piccolo, flute, oboe, English horn, two clarinets, two bassoons, two French horns, two trumpets, trombone, percussionist on timpani and chimes, harp, and strings.

Reception
William Yeoman of Gramophone praised Loon Lake, writing, "Here, songs both avian and pastoral for a multitude of wind soloists punctuate a luminous, if occasionally overcast, orchestral skyscape."  The music critic David Hurwitz was more critical, however, remarking:

See also
List of compositions by Alan Hovhaness

References

 63
1988 compositions
20th-century classical music
Compositions for symphony orchestra